David Quirke may refer to:

 Dave Quirke (born 1947), Irish footballer
 David Quirke (hurler) (born 1970), Irish hurler